The Orielles are an English indie rock band from Halifax, West Yorkshire, England.
The band features Sidonie "Sid" B. Hand-Halford on drums, Esmé Dee Hand-Halford on bass and vocals and Henry Carlyle Wade on guitar and vocals.

Career 
Their debut album, Silver Dollar Moment, was released in February 2018 on Heavenly Records. AllMusic described the album as a "stunning debut... it does have a uniquely sweet spirit and lighthearted beauty all its own by a young U.K. trio that gives the baggy indie dance sound of the early '90s a serious upgrade."

Their second album, Disco Volador, was released in February 2020 on Heavenly Records. It was produced by Marta Sologni. The Guardian gave it a three out of five stars rating, describing the album as the band "expanding the sound of their winsome but somewhat conventional debut by abandoning traditional song structures and voyaging into new textures." It has a Metacritic rating of 73, with Uncut commenting that the album mixes "the euphoria of whooshing through infinite space past astral displays of imagined beauty via a blend of disco funk, dream pop, electronic exotica and '70s highlife" and Q expressing that the album is "both instantly appealing and dazzling inventive."

On October 7, 2022, the band released their third album, Tableau, on Heavenly Records. The band describe the album as "an experimental double album", and it was self-produced in collaboration with Joel Anthony Patchett.

Discography

Albums
 Silver Dollar Moment (2018)
 Disco Volador (2020)
 La Vita Olistica (2021)
 Tableau (2022)

Singles
 "Yawn" (2014)
 "Space Doubt" (2015)
 "Joey Says We Got It" (2015)
 "Jobin" (2016)
 "Sugar Tastes Like Salt" (2017)
 "I Only Bought It For the Bottle (2017)
 "Let Your Dogtooth Grow" (2017)
 "Blue Suitcase (Disco Wrist)" (2018)
 "Bobbi's Second World" (2018)
 "It Makes You Forget (Itgehane)" (2019)
 "Come Down On Jupiter" (2019)
 "Space Samba (Disco Volador Theme)" (2020)
 "Beam/s" (2022)
 "The Room" (2022)

References

English indie rock groups
Heavenly Recordings artists
People from Halifax, West Yorkshire